Meiyo CCN Pro Cycling is a Taiwanese UCI Continental team founded in 2005.

Team roster

Major results
2018
Stage 6 Tour du Maroc, Jacob Tipper
Stage 11 Tour of Qinghai Lake, Jacob Tipper
Stage 3 Tour of Quanzhou Bay, Roy Eefting

2019
Stage 1 Tour du Maroc, Ben Hetherington
Stages 11 & 12 Tour of Qinghai Lake, Roy Eefting
Stage 3 Tour of Xingtai, Roy Eefting

2022
Stage 1 (ITT) Sharjah International Cycling Tour, Cyrus Monk

References

External links

UCI Continental Teams (Europe)
UCI Continental Teams (Asia)
Cycling teams based in Finland
Cycling teams established in 2005
Cycling teams based in Sweden
Cycling teams based in Kuwait
Cycling teams based in Taiwan